Zhemchuzhino is a rural locality (a village) in Kovarditskoye Rural Settlement, Muromsky District, Vladimir Oblast, Russia. The population was 33 as of 2010. There are 2 streets.

Geography 
Zhemchuzhino is located on the Ilevna River, 10 km southwest of Murom (the district's administrative centre) by road. Lazarevo is the nearest rural locality.

References 

Rural localities in Muromsky District